Dalimb is a village in Maharashtra, India. It is located in Umarga Taluka in Osmanabad district. The village resides in the Marathwada region, and falls under the supervision of the Aurangabad division. Located 67 km towards east from the district headquarters Osmanabad, the village is also 13 km from Umarga and 471 km from the state capital Mumbai.

Demographics 
The main language spoken here is Marathi.

Nearby villages 

 Dawal Malikwadi is 4 km away
 Rampur is 5 km away
 Yenegur is 6 km away
 Sundarwadi is 6 km away
 Naiknagar is 6 km away

Dalimb is surrounded by Åland taluka towards south, Lohara taluka towards north, Ausa taluka towards north, Tuljapur taluka towards west.

Nearby cities 
The cities near to Dalimb are Umarga, Tuljapur, Nilanga, Solapur.

Postal details 
The pin code of Dalimb is - 413604.

Politics 
The National Congress Party (NCP), Shiv Sena, SHS and INC are the major political parties in Dalimb.

Polling stations near Dalimb 

 Z.P.P.S Dagadadhanora
 Z.P.P.S Dalimb Central side
 Z.P.P.S Dalimb east side
 Gram Panchayat office Bedaga

Education 
The colleges near Dalimb are:

 Shri Sharadchandraji Pawar Junior college Naichakur
 National Backward Agriculture Education Information Technology Osmanabad
 Sevagram college
 Sevagram college, Kawatha

The schools in Dalimb are:

 Maulana Azad Urdu High School
 Dyandeep Vidyalaya
 Z.P.C.P school

References 

Villages in Osmanabad district